The 1994–95 Combined Counties Football League season was the 17th in the history of the Combined Counties Football League, a football competition in England.

The league was won by Ashford Town (Middlesex) for the first time.

League table

The league was reduced from 21 clubs to 18 after Ditton, Farleigh Rovers and Virginia Water joined the Surrey County Premier League, and Frimley Green joined the Surrey Intermediate League. One new club joined:

Netherne, joining from the Surrey County Premier League.

References

External links
 Combined Counties League Official Site

1994-95
1994–95 in English football leagues